Pius C. Kuriakose (born 2 October 1951) was the Lokayukta of the state of Kerala and was the Chief Justice of Sikkim High Court.

Early life
He was born in Thripunithura, Ernakulam District, Kerala, India on 2 October 1951. He completed his education from St. Mary's Lower Primary School, Thripunithura, Leo XIII English Medium High School, Alappuzaha, Government Boys' High School, Thripunithura, Maharajas College, Ernakulam and Maharajas Law College, Ernakulam.

Career
He enrolled as an Advocate on 9 November 1974 and was practicing in Ernakulam in civil, rent control, land acquisition, constitutional and criminal matters. He was appointed Additional Judge in Kerala High Court on 9 September 2002 and he became designated as the Permanent Judge of Kerala High Court on 8 September 2004.

References

20th-century Indian judges
Scholars from Kochi
1951 births
Living people
Judges of the Kerala High Court
Ombudsmen in India
Corruption in Kerala
Chief Justices of the Sikkim High Court